W. D. Burrows House, also known as Hopewell, is a historic home and farm located at Kenton, Kent County, Delaware.  The house was built about 1830, and is a two-story, five bay, center hall plan brick dwelling. It has a full basement and gable roof.  Also on the property are a contributing barn, a machine shed, chicken house and assorted storage
sheds.  They are dated to the late-19th and early-20th centuries.

It was listed on the National Register of Historic Places in 1983.

References

Farms on the National Register of Historic Places in Delaware
Houses completed in 1830
Houses in Kent County, Delaware
Kenton, Delaware
1830 establishments in Delaware
National Register of Historic Places in Kent County, Delaware